The Boy Who Flew to the Moon, Vol. 1 is the first greatest hits album by American musician Kid Cudi. It was released on July 8, 2022, by Republic Records and Cudi's Wicked Awesome imprint. The compilation includes tracks from seven of his previous studio albums: Man on the Moon: The End of Day (2009), Man on the Moon II: The Legend of Mr. Rager (2010), Indicud (2013), Satellite Flight: The Journey to Mother Moon (2014), Speedin' Bullet 2 Heaven (2015), Passion, Pain & Demon Slayin' (2016) and Man on the Moon III: The Chosen (2020). Also included are songs from his rock band, WZRD's eponymously titled debut album (2012). The album concludes with a re-mastered version of his 2015 non-album song "Love", as a bonus track. The Boy Who Flew to the Moon, Vol. 1 anthologizes songs by Cudi since his major-label debut, including those released during his joint deal with Kanye West's GOOD Music and major-label Republic.

Background and promotion

In June 2022, Cudi announced his first arena tour with To the Moon World Tour, set to begin in Vancouver on August 16, 2022, and conclude in Milan on November 22, 2022. On July 4, 2022, Kid Cudi took to Twitter to announce the release of his first "best-of" album, along with the re-issue of his debut mixtape A Kid Named Cudi on July 15 to digital streaming platforms (DSP). He revealed the compilation would be released on July 8. On July 5, Cudi unveiled the compilation's album cover, which features Cudi on a New York City rooftop wearing black Gucci x The North Face overalls. The following day, July 6, he revealed the track listing. Later that day he announced plans to release volume two of the collection at the end of 2022.

Content
The Boy Who Flew to the Moon, Vol. 1 consists of 18 tracks spanning 14 years of music from Kid Cudi's career, including collaborative work with André 3000, Pharrell Williams, MGMT and other artists. Three tracks come from Man on the Moon III: The Chosen, the most to be featured from one album. "Day 'n' Nite", Cudi's breakout single represents the oldest material on the compilation, having originally been recorded in 2007 for his debut mixtape A Kid Named Cudi (2008). The second track on the compilation, "Pursuit of Happiness", appeared on Cudi's 2009 major-label debut album Man on the Moon: The End of Day. The compilation also features "The Dream Time Machine" and "Upper Room", album cuts taken from WZRD, the debut album of Cudi and Dot da Genius’ collective side project, alternative rock band WZRD. Also included are "Confused!" and "Speedin' Bullet 2 Heaven" the lead singles from Cudi’s punk rock/grunge-inspired fifth album Speedin' Bullet 2 Heaven. The song "Love", which appears as the bonus track, contains a sample of "Sunblocks" as performed by American electronic rock duo Ratatat and was originally recorded in 2013 during the Satellite Flight: The Journey to Mother Moon sessions, however had been officially unreleased due to sample clearance issues.

Critical reception

Neil Yeung of Allmusic gave it a 4 out of 5 rating, writing “packaged together, this compilation provides a fascinating peek into both Cudi's evolution and artistic scope, presenting a figure that maybe doesn't get enough credit for the creative leaps he's taken and the inspiration that he's provided to contemporaries and up-and-coming artists alike.”

Track listing 

Notes
 signifies a co-producer
 signifies an additional producer

Charts

Personnel
Credits for The Boy Who Flew to the Moon, Vol. 1 adapted from AllMusic.

Denzel Baptiste – composer
André Benjamin – composer, primary artist
David Biral – composer
Peter Brown – composer
John Bruce – composer
King Chip – primary artist
Thomas Cullison – recording
Dennis Cummings – executive producer, producer
Emile – producer
Rusty Evans – composer
Iain Findlay – mixing, recording
Daniel Fornero – trumpet
Chris Gehringer – mastering engineer
Dot Da Genius – drums, executive producer, guitar (bass), keyboards, mixing, percussion, piano, producer, recording
Noah Goldstein – mixing, recording
Mick Guzauski – mixing
Emile Haynie – Composer, Producer, Recording
Ken "Duro" Ifill – A&R
Alex Iles – trombone
Kid Cudi – Drums, Executive Producer, Guitar, Keyboards, Percussion, Primary Artist, Producer, Programmer, Programming
Anthony Kilhoffer – Mixing, Recording
Anthony Kronfle – recording
Joe LaPorta – mastering engineer
Mike Larson – recording
Nick Littlemore – engineer
Cesar Loza Assistant – rngineer
Erik Madrid – mixing assistant
Manny Marroquin – mixing
Evan Mast – composer, recording
Jim McMillen – horn arrangements
Vlado Meller – mastering engineer
Scott Mescudi – Composer, Executive Producer, Producer
MGMT – primary artist
Christian Mochizuki – recording
Mike Moore – Drums, Programming
Finneas O'Connell – Composer, Producer
Oladipo Omishore – Composer, Executive Producer, Producer, Recording
Brent Paschke – Guitar (Electric)
Victoria Pike – Composer
Plain Pat – Producer
Christian Plata – Mixing Assistant
Teddy Randazzo Composer
Ratatat – Primary Artist, Producer
Patrick Reynolds – Composer, Producer
Raphael Saadiq – Guitar, Primary Artist, Vocals (Background)
Mark Santangelo – Mastering Engineer
Robert Schaer – Trumpet
Bradford Smith – Mixing Assistant
Luke Steelen – Engineer
Mike Stroud – Composer
William J Sullivan – Engineer
Take a Daytrip – Producer
Doug Tornquist – Tuba
Steve Trapani – Trombone (Bass)
Mike Steven Velez – Mixing Engineer
Ryan West – Recording
Charles Wiggins – composer
Pharrell Williams – Composer, Primary Artist, Producer
Charles Worth – Composer
WZRD – Primary Artist, Producer

Release history

See also
List of songs recorded by Kid Cudi

References

2022 greatest hits albums
Kid Cudi albums
Republic Records compilation albums
Compilation albums by American artists
Alternative hip hop compilation albums
Alternative rock compilation albums
Albums produced by Kid Cudi
Albums produced by Dot da Genius
Albums produced by Emile Haynie
Albums produced by Pharrell Williams
Albums produced by Plain Pat
Albums produced by Take a Daytrip